The following data is current as of the end of the 2021 season, which ended after the 2022 NCAA Division I Football Championship Game. The following reflects the records according to the NCAA. This list took into account results modified later due to NCAA action, such as vacated victories and forfeits. Percentages are figured to 3 decimal places. In the event of a tie, the team with the most wins is listed first.

*Ties count as one-half win and one-half loss.

ASUN-WAC

Big Sky Conference

Big South Conference

Colonial Athletic Association

Independent

Ivy League

Mid-Eastern Athletic Conference

Missouri Valley Football Conference

Northeast Conference

Ohio Valley Conference

Patriot League

Pioneer Football League

Southern Conference

Southland Conference

Southwestern Athletic Conference

References

 

NCAA Division I FCS football
Lists of college football team records